Playmen was an Italian adult entertainment magazine. It was founded in 1967 by a mother of three, Adelina Tattilo, achieving fame as Italy's version of Playboy magazine.

The magazine was published monthly and featured photographs of nude women, and articles on fashion, sport, consumer goods and public figures. Playmen's use of "tasteful" nude photos is classified as softcore in contrast to hardcore pornographic magazines. It ceased publication in 2001.

Early years
During a running battle with the Italian police, the magazine reached a circulation of 450,000 within four years of its 1967 inception. It sold at about the equivalent of a US dollar per copy.

Playmen was initially an imitator of Playboy magazine, although the first Girl of the Month, Brigitte Bardot, held her hands to cover her breasts. Playmen later developed a style of its own, reflecting European tastes and not overly displaying breasts as per the American Playboy counterpart. The founder Tattilo is quoted as saying "The U.S. is a matriarchy. I think this is the reason for the American male preference for women with exaggerated, voluminous bosoms." 

In the early years, with Italy still a religiously conservative society at the time, each month the Italian police in some cities would order a mass seizure of the magazine.  Playmen rarely lasted more than 48 hours on the newsstands before either being sold out or seized by the police.

Content
Many actresses began their careers on the cover of Playmen: Pamela Villoresi, the singer Patty Pravo, the actress Ornella Muti, the singer Amanda Lear and many others. The magazine contained notables such as Teresa Ann Savoy, Barbara Bouchet, Lilli Carati, and Camille Keaton. The July 1968 edition contains an article by Henry Miller. In the December 1972 issue, Playmen obtained an international scoop: it published the photo of Jacqueline Kennedy, then wife of Aristotle Onassis, while she was naked in the swimming pool of their villa in the island of Skorpios. The photos were not published in the United States until Hustler Magazine printed them in 1975.

In addition to naked women it occasionally also depicted naked men.  It paid John Paul Getty III (who was 16 at the time) $1,000 for a naked photo spread and cover of the August 1973 issue – on newsstands a month after the oil empire heir had been kidnapped in Rome.
  
The magazine contained interviews of significant people in literature, cinema, politics, and sport.

In the 1990s, with the arrival on the market of pornographic videocassettes, the magazine's sales dropped significantly and advertising revenue sharply declined, causing Tattilo's empire to gradually enter a crisis, followed by the closure of Playmen in 2001.

Adelina Magazine
Adelina was "America's edition of Italy's Playmen".

See also
 List of magazines in Italy

References

External links
 Tattilo Obituary
Time magazine report 18 Jan 1971
Time magazine report 11 Dec 1972
Il Gionale 5 March 2007

1967 establishments in Italy
2001 disestablishments in Italy
Defunct magazines published in Italy
Italian-language magazines
Italian pornography
Magazines established in 1967
Magazines disestablished in 2001
Monthly magazines published in Italy
Obscenity controversies in literature
Pornographic men's magazines